Pet the Tiger is the sixth studio album by rock band Katrina and the Waves, released in 1991 by Virgin Records. It was the band's only release on the label after signing with Virgin Germany, before moving to Polydor Records for their next two albums. The album features two songwriting collaborations with Liam Sternberg, writer of the Bangles' "Walk Like an Egyptian", and production and musical contributions from keyboardist Bob Andrews (Brinsley Schwarz, Graham Parker and the Rumour).

The album charted in the Swedish album charts at number 48.

Track listing

Personnel
Credits adapted from the album's liner notes.

Katrina and the Waves
Katrina Leskanich – vocals, guitar
Kimberley Rew – guitar, vocals
Vince de la Cruz – bass, guitar, vocals
Alex Cooper – drums, vocals

Additional musicians
Tim Lee – Hammond organ
Bob Andrews – Hammond organ and keyboards on 4

Technical
Gordon Bennet – producer (except 4), mixing (8)
Bob Andrews – producer (4), co-producer (3)
Stephen Stewart – engineer, mixing (4) 
Ted Hayton – mixing (except 2-4, 8) 
Matthew Ellard – assistant mixing engineer (except 2-4, 8)
John Luongo – mixing (2, 3)
Gary Hellman – mixing (2, 3)

Charts

References 

Katrina and the Waves albums
1991 albums
Virgin Records albums